Kavak is a village in Silifke district of Mersin Province, Turkey. At  it is situated in a canyon in Toros Mountains.   The population of Kavak was 183  as of 2011.

References

External links
For images

Villages in Silifke District
Populated places in Mersin Province